Wheeling is an unincorporated community in Winn Parish, Louisiana.

References

Unincorporated communities in Winn Parish, Louisiana